Angelo Gelsomini (27 January 1932 – 8 April 2021) was an Italian wrestler. He competed in the men's freestyle featherweight at the 1960 Summer Olympics. He died in April 2021, at the age of 89.

References

External links
 

1932 births
2021 deaths
Italian male sport wrestlers
Olympic wrestlers of Italy
Wrestlers at the 1960 Summer Olympics
People from Narni
Sportspeople from the Province of Terni
20th-century Italian people
21st-century Italian people